"Tridesete" is a song by Croatian singer Severina from her 9th studio album, Zdravo Marijo (2008). Written by Marina Tucaković, Ljiljana Jorgovanović, Goran Bregović and Severina and produced by Goran Bregović. Released as the album's third single, the track received major release in December 2008.

Single release
The song received major radio air-play and is one of Severina's most successful songs in years.

Critical reception
The critical response to "Tridesete" was overwhelmingly positive. The critics praised Severina's edgy vocals as well as the lyrics, music and style.

Music video
The video was released at the same time as the single, and the public panned it because of the resemblance to the Britney Spears' video for the track "Circus". 86% of the Croatian, Serbian and Bosnian critics loved the video, and a few of them actually said that "It doesn't make any resemblance to the Britney Spears video" and that "Severina is by far one of the best artists in former Yugoslavia".

Official versions
"Tridesete" (Main Version)
"Tridesete" (Instrumental)
"Tridesete" (Acapella)
"Tridesete" (Electro Mix)
"Tridesete" (Live Version)

2008 singles
Songs written by Goran Bregović
Croatian songs
Songs written by Marina Tucaković
2008 songs